"Guardian" is a song by Canadian-American recording artist Alanis Morissette, released as the lead single from her eighth studio album, Havoc and Bright Lights (2012). The song was written by Morissette and Guy Sigsworth, and produced by Sigsworth and Joe Chiccarelli. It is a rock song, in which Morissette promises to look after a special someone.

The song received positive reviews from music critics, with most of them praising her return and commending its freshness and brightness. The music video was released on July 27, 2012, and it shows Morissette singing on a Berlin rooftop equipped with a set of angel wings and eventually brightens the children and parents she is watching over.

The song was a moderate success in some countries, peaking inside the top 20 on the Austrian and Switzerland charts, while reaching number 41 on the Canadian Hot 100 chart and charting on the Billboard's Adult Pop Songs chart.  Morissette has promoted the track with live performances, including Dancing with the Stars, The Ellen DeGeneres Show and The View.

Background and recording 
After finishing promotion for Flavors of Entanglement and leaving Maverick Records, Morissette got married and gave birth to a son in 2010. She didn't give information about writing an album, however she was seen leaving Sunset Sound Recorders in Los Angeles (meanwhile the company listed her as a 2011 client). Finally, in November 2011, Morissette appeared at American Music Awards, where she said she had written 31 songs and would release an album the next summer.

On May 1, 2012, Morissette announced through Facebook she would be making a few big announcements over the next days. The following day Billboard magazine reported Morissette would release her next studio album, Havoc and Bright Lights, on August 28. Billboard also revealed the title of the album's lead single.

Morissette released an official lyric video exclusively through MetroLyrics on May 10. While sharing the lyrics of "Guardian", she wrote: "So excited to share these with you. The greatest offering and aspiration within any relationship, for me, is the willingness to combine protection, commitment, vulnerability, tenacity, tenderness, constancy, empathy, mutuality, intentionality, innocence, presence, courage, freedom-offering and beautiful humanity at the same time. This song speaks to that commitment to both my sweet son, as well as my own inner child".

Composition 

"Guardian" was written by Morissette and Guy Sigsworth, while production was handled by Joe Chiccarelli and Sigsworth. The song lasts for 4 minutes and 18 seconds (the radio version being almost a minute shorter). It is a rock song with a standard song structure with heavy guitar/keyboard introduction. The song features a sunny melody highlighted by piano and electric guitar. The song is a direct celebration of motherhood and it speaks of angels and keepers, wardens and warriors, mixing imagery of care and protection. She sings: "You in the chaos, feigning sane / You who has pushed beyond what’s humane / Them as the ghostly tumbleweed / And where was your watchman then?". On the hook, Morissette promises to look after a special someone — most likely her one-year-old son. She sings: "I’ll be your keeper for life as your guardian / I’ll be your warrior of care, your first warden / I’ll be your angel on call, I’ll be on demand / The greatest honor of all as your guardian."

Critical reception 
The song received positive reviews from most music critics. Scott Shetler from "Pop Crush" wrote that "'Guardian’ is short, poppy and a welcome return for the Canadian superstar." Robbie Daw of Idolator praised the song, writing: "It’s a bright guitar-pop jam that shines with instant Morissette familiarity while still managing to sound fresh. Who knew that after all these years Bright And Sunny Alanis would be our favorite?." Kyle Anderson from Entertainment Weekly'''s Music Mix wrote that the song "sticks to the loud-quiet-loud alt-rock dynamic, keeping up that trend, and happily also feeling like old-school Alanis." Hermione Hoby wrote for The Observer that "Guardian" is "anthemic and power chord-heavy." Jonathan Keefe wrote for Slant Magazine that the song "boast lyrical hook that is as plainspoken and genuinely lovely as anything she's ever written."

Robert Copsey from Digital Spy wrote that the track is "a light and airy ode to the husband and son she's accumulated in the last four years and told with a Cheshire Cat-like grin that's almost audible by the final chorus."  Jody Rosen from Rolling Stone gave the song 3 out of 5 stars, commenting: "Morissette's warble still has the power to peel shingles off rooftops. It is an oath of fidelity, presumably to a lover, but when she begins yowling the chorus – "I'll be your keeper for life as your guardian" – it sounds like a threat." However, Simon Price of The Independent called it "an American Idol fodder, setting the tone for more tedious MOR."

 Chart performance 
"Guardian" had moderate impact on the charts. did best in countries where it had the most airplay therefore successful in Austria, the song debuted at number 38, on the Ö3 Austria Top 40, on July 27, 2012. The following week, the song fell to number 40. However, it jumped to number 14, in its third week, on August 10, 2012. Later, it fell to number 25, however, the song climbed to number 17 the following week, then peaked again at number 11  In Switzerland, it was a success, reaching number 12. In Netherlands, the song has slowly risen on the charts. It debuted at number 87 on the Dutch Top 40 chart, on June 30, 2012. Later, the song climbed to number 74 and peaked at number 70 the following week. After falling to numbers 78 and 80, the song moved again to number 78. However, the song kept fluctuating on the chart for the next three weeks, until it reached number 62, its peak position, so far. in Germany it was also successful reaching number 13 on the singles chart.

In Brazil, the song debuted in the lower parts of the chart, but after accumulating airplay for three weeks, peaked at number 31, becoming another top 40 hit for Morissette in that country.

"Guardian" wasn't successful as her others lead-singles in Canada. Its peak position is her lowest since 1993's "Real World", the third and last single from her second studio album "Now Is the Time" (1992), which peaked at number 85. It debuted at number 65 on the Canadian Hot 100 chart, for the issue dated June 2, 2012, becoming the "Highest Debut" of the week. However, the song dropped out the Canadian chart the following week. After two weeks out of the chart, the song re-entered at number 90, becoming the "Best Comeback" of the week ending June 23, 2012. On July 7, 2012, the song climbed from number 92 to number 78. The song jumped to number 74 the following week, while it reached number 70, on July 21, 2012. "Guardian" kept fluctuating on the chart for the next three weeks, until it reached number 67. On the week ending August 25, 2012, the song climbed to number 64, while on the week ending September 1, 2012, the song climbed to number 63. On the week of Havoc and Bright Lights' release, the song leaped to number 41.

The song debuted at number 37 on the Adult Pop Songs chart. The song has reached number 27, so far. The song wasn't able to chart on the Billboard Hot 100 chart, only reaching number 19 on the Bubbling Under Hot 100 Singles. In Japan, the song rose from number 86 to number 43. In Ireland, the song debuted and peaked at number 51.

 Music video 

 Background 
The official music video for "Guardian" premiered on July 27, 2012, on the New Zealand website 'Stuff'. The clip was filmed in Berlin and features the singer dressed as an angel with a pair of large white-feathered wings. "This video is a tip of the hat to Wim Wenders' Wings of Desire - it is the 25th anniversary of the film having been released," Morissette told Spinner magazine. "I think it really shows how the parent/guardian-angel roles are linked," Morissette says. "How, ultimately, a powerful inner parent calls upon spirit to guide her or his choices on the loved one's behalf, whether it is for a child, a friend, or an inner child. This love and this grace is available to everyone."

"The full circle poetry of my having written 'Uninvited' for its remake, combined with my love of the original movie... my love of Germany, having lived there for three years as a child (by the Black Forest), combined most importantly with how this video is such a visual extension of the song 'Guardian,' which is so close to my heart… it was so much fun to make it in Berlin!."

 Synopsis 

The video begins in monochrome with Morissette writing 'I'll be your keeper for life', and then introduces Morissette overlooking the city of Berlin, with a pair of wings attached to her back. We are provided with glimpses of the city beneath; people walking by; and trains going by; all within the public square of Alexanderplatz. A couple with their teenager daughter begins to argue with each other, and the daughter sits by the Alexanderplatz fountain, watching. The mother then leaves the father, and the daughter is left looking helpless towards the sky. During the chorus, with the video now in color, we see a 'normal' Morissette situated in a white abstract room, playing the guitar and singing amongst her new band members. The video cuts to the city yet again, this time with the 'guardian' Morissette looking down upon a boy who is bullied, and is left looking helpless to the sky. The video then switches back to the 'normal' Morissette during the chorus, and yet again to the city; this time with a man hugging goodbye his wife and newborn. The video concludes with the teenage girl, the bullied child, and the mother, looking towards the sky, with the sense of comfort, realizing they have a 'guardian'. Morissette then walks up towards the camera, pleased, and the video fades out with a smile on her face.

 Reception 
X. Alexander of Idolator Blog expressed a mixed opinion, writing "Guardian carries on with the long-standing music video tradition of pop stars as emotive savior to the masses, though it’s a bit unclear just how much of a 'guardian' Alanis really is, since she mostly just stands there watching and singing as a kid is bullied and a girl deals with her fighting parents. Plus, going from playing God to a mere angel — isn’t that a pretty major demotion?."

 Live performances 
Morissette performed "Guardian" on March 21, 2012 (along with another new song, "Spiral") during "Guitar Center Sessions with host Nic Harcourt" on DirecTV. She promoted the song on Dancing with the Stars the day the song was released. On May 22, Morissette performed the song on The Ellen DeGeneres Show''.

Track listing 
Digital download
 "Guardian" – 4:18
CD single
 "Guardian" – 4:18
 "Lens" – 4:06
 "Ironic" (Live in Berlin) – 4:03
 "You Oughta Know" (Live in Berlin) – 5:10

Charts and certifications

Weekly charts

Year-end charts

Certifications

Radio adds and release history

References 

2012 singles
Songs written by Alanis Morissette
2012 songs
Songs written by Guy Sigsworth
Song recordings produced by Guy Sigsworth